Nestoras Batzelas (born January 7, 1980, in Larissa, Thessalia) is a Greek MMA fighter and retired amateur freestyle wrestler, who competed in the men's super heavyweight category. Batzelas has been selected to the nation's Olympic wrestling team when Greece hosted the 2004 Summer Olympics in Athens, and also trained as a member of the wrestling team for E.A. Larissa, under his personal coach Konstantinos Avramis.

Batzelas qualified for the Greek squad in the men's super heavyweight class (120 kg), when Greece welcomed the world to the 2004 Summer Olympics in Athens. He filled up an entry by the International Federation of Association Wrestling and the Hellenic Olympic Committee, as Greece received an automatic berth for being the host nation. He lost his opening match to 2000 Olympic bronze medalist Alexis Rodríguez of Cuba on technical superiority, but bounced back to dismantle Ukraine's Serhii Priadun with a 5–0 decision in front of the home crowd inside Ano Liossia Olympic Hall. Placing second in the prelim pool and thirteenth overall, Batzelas' performance fell short to put him further into the quarterfinals.

Championships and accomplishments

MMA
No Limits
No Limits Heavyweight Champion (1 Time)

Professional mixed martial arts record

|-
| Loss
|align=center|6-2
|Ioannis Arzoumanidis
|Decision (Unanimous)
|MMA Challenge Pro 2 
|
|align=center|3
|align=center|5:00
|Thessaloniki, Greece
|For MMA Challenge Pro Heavyweight Championship.
|-
| Win
|align=center|6-1
|George Katsinopoulos
|TKO (Punches)
|No Limits 23 
|
|align=center|3
|align=center|
|Athens, Greece
|Wins No Limits Heavyweight Championship.
|-
| Loss
| align=center| 5-1
| Ricco Rodriguez
| TKO (punches)
|  Final Fight Championship 10
| 
| align=center|2
| align=center|3:33
| Skopje, Macedonia
| 
|-
| Win
|align=center|5-0
|Julian Chilikov
|Submission (Guillotine Choke)
|GFC - Greek Fighting Championship 4
|
|align=center|1
|align=center|
|Larissa, Greece
|
|-
| Win
|align=center|4-0
|Emil Zahariev
|Submission (Heel Hook)
|No Limits 20 
|
|align=center|1
|align=center|
|Athens, Greece
|
|-
| Win
|align=center|3-0
|Emil Zahariev
|TKO (RTD)
|
|
|align=center|1
|align=center|5:00
|Thessaloniki, Greece
|
|-
| Win
|align=center|2-0
|Borislav Balabanov
|TKO (Punches)
|Throwdown MMA Championship 
|
|align=center|1
|align=center|
|Greece
|
|-
| Win
|align=center|1-0
|Marian Rusu
|Submission (Punches)
|GFC - Greek Fighting Championship 2
|
|align=center|1
|align=center|3:27
|Athens, Greece
|
|-

Amateur mixed martial arts record

| Loss
|align=center|0-1
|Allen Crowder
|TKO (Referee Stoppage)
|Battle In The South VI
|
|align=center|1
|align=center|1:26
|Wilmington, North Carolina, United States
|Fight was for the Heavyweight Title.
|-

References

External links
Profile – International Wrestling Database

1980 births
Living people
Greek male sport wrestlers
Olympic wrestlers of Greece
Wrestlers at the 2004 Summer Olympics
Sportspeople from Larissa
Greek male mixed martial artists
Mixed martial artists utilizing freestyle wrestling